Woodbridge N. Ferris (1853–1928) was a U.S. Senator from Michigan from 1923 to 1928. Senator Ferris may also refer to:

 Jeannie Ferris (1941–2007), Australian senator
Joshua Beal Ferris (1804–1886), Connecticut State Senate
Mortimer Y. Ferris (1881–1941), New York State Senate